The 2011 Porsche Carrera Cup Great Britain was the ninth season of the Porsche Carrera Cup Great Britain series. The series again featured on the same package as the British Touring Car Championship, and as such benefited from live coverage at each round on ITV4 in the United Kingdom.

2011 will see the introduction of a new 911 GT3 Cup car, featuring more power, downforce and other technological changes.

Entry List
Porsche had announced a capacity entry list for 2011 with several new teams expected to join the championship, but a grid of 25 cars appeared at the first meeting.

 All drivers will race in Porsche 911 GT3s. Guest drivers in italics.

Race calendar and results
On 8 September 2010, the British Touring Car Championship announced the race calendar for the 2011 season for all of the series competing on the TOCA package.
On 14 January 2011, Porsche released an amended calendar with the meeting at Croft being replaced by a single race in Germany at the Nürburgring Nordschleife as part of the Porsche Carrera World Cup. As such, the championship will be contested over 19 races.

Championship standings

References

Porsche Carrera Cup
Porsche Carrera Cup Great Britain seasons